The Japan Maritime Self Defence Force Kure Museum is a Japanese military museum located in Kure, Hiroshima. It is also known as the "Iron Whale Museum" after its main exhibit, JMSDF's diesel-electric submarine Akishio (decommissioned in 2004). 

The museum is to hold exhibits related to minesweeping and submarine operations. The JMSDF also has museums related to aircraft at Kanoya, Kagoshima and related to surface vessels at Sasebo, Nagasaki. It displays a number of torpedoes.

It is located next to the Yamato Museum.

Gallery

References

External list
 Official website

Military and war museums in Japan
Museums in Hiroshima
Kure, Hiroshima
Japan Maritime Self-Defense Force
Museums established in 2007
2007 establishments in Japan